Jamyangiin Chuluun (1928 – 1996) was a Mongolian composer, conductor and violinist.

Chuluun was born in the Jargalant sum of Khovd aimag in Mongolia. From 1939 he began working at the Töv (central) theatre and learned the violin studying with the soviet guest artist Boris Fyodorovich Smirnov and others. From 1950 until into the 1960s he worked at the same theater as a musician and at the Khovd Teacher's Academy as violin instructor.

From 1960–1988 he worked at the National Theater of Opera and Ballet, and after that as principal conductor and art director at the National Philharmonic, where he led the production of more than 20 opera and ballet works.

Notable compositions 
 Collage for violin and orchestra, 1949
 Variations on two Folksongs, violin and orchestra, 1951
 "Melody", violin ensemble, 1972
 "Skillful Khas", ballet, 1973
 "Mountain brook", violin ensemble, 1975
 Film scores

External links
 Жамъянгийн Чулуун – biography on urlag.mn

Mongolian composers
1928 births
1996 deaths
People from Khovd Province
20th-century classical composers
Male classical composers
20th-century male musicians
People's Artists of Mongolia